The Music of Pakistan includes diverse elements ranging from music from various parts of South Asia as well as Central Asian, Middle Eastern, and modern-day Western popular music influences. With these multiple influences, a distinctive Pakistani music has emerged.

EMI Pakistan is the country's biggest record label, as of 2015 holding the licenses of some 60,000 Pakistani artists and around 70% of the total music of the country, while streaming service Patari has the largest independent digital collection, with some 3,000 artists and 50,000 songs.

Traditional music
The classical music of Pakistan is based on the traditional music that was patronized by various empires that ruled the region and gave birth to several genres of classic music including the Klasik. The classical music of Pakistan has two main principles, ‘sur’ (musical note) and ‘lai’ (rhythm). The systematic organization of musical notes into a scale is known as a raag. The arrangement of rhythm (lai) in a cycle is known as taal. Improvisation plays a major role during a performance.

There are many families from gharanas of classical music who inherited the music from their forefathers and are still performing. Some famous gharanas are: Qwaal Bacha gharana (Ustad Nusrat Fateh Ali Khan and Rahat Fateh Ali Khan belong to this gharana), and Patiala Gharana (Shafqat Amanat Ali Khan belongs to this gharana).Ustad Ghulam Farid Nizami a prominent sitar player and a Sufi singer belongs to the Senia Gharana. Number of other gharanas are present in Pakistan which serve classical music. Some classical musicians like Ustad Badar uz Zaman do not belong to any famous gharana but has served classical music enormously. The legendary sitar player Mohammad Sharif Khan Poonchwaley belongs to Poonch gharana of sitar. Ustad Rais Khan is another prominent sitar player of Pakistan.

Shaukat Hussain, Tari Khan and Tafo Khan have been exponents of classical tabla playing from Pakistan. Talib Hussain was one of the last remaining pakhawaj players of Pakistan and was a recognized practitioner of the Punjab gharana style of drum-type instruments.

Ghazal 

In poetry, the ghazal is a poetic form consisting of couplets which share a rhyme and a refrain. Each line must share the same meter. Etymologically, the word literally refers to "the mortal cry of a gazelle". The animal is called Ghizaal, from which the English word gazelle stems, or Kastori haran (where haran refers to deer) in Urdu. Ghazals are traditionally expressions of love, separation and loneliness, for which the gazelle is an appropriate image. A ghazal can thus be understood as a poetic expression of both the pain of loss or separation of the lover and the beauty of love in spite of that pain. The structural requirements of the ghazal are more stringent than those of most poetic forms traditionally written in English. In its style and content, it is a genre that has proved studied variety of expression around its central theme of love and separation between lovers. The ghazals can be written by male poets for women as well as by female poets for men, as an expression of one's feelings about mutual love and whatever comes in that package- accompanying joys, frustrations, disappointments, fulfillment and satisfactions. The ghazal spread into South Asia in the 12th century under the influence of the new Islamic Sultanate courts and Sufi mystics. Exotic to the region, as is indicated by the very sounds of the name itself when properly pronounced as ġazal. Although the ghazal is most prominently a form of Urdu poetry, today, it has influenced the poetry of many languages. Most Ghazal singers are trained in classical music and sing in either Khyal or Thumri.

Qawwali

Qawwali is the devotional music of the Chishti Sufis. Qawwali is a vibrant musical tradition that goes back more than 700 years in South Asia. Although most Qawwali singers are found in Pakistan and they performed mainly at Sufi shrines throughout South Asia,  it has also gained mainstream popularity. Qawwali music received international exposure through the work of the Sabri Brothers in 1975, late Bakhshi Salamat, Aziz Mian and Nusrat Fateh Ali Khan, largely due to several releases on the 'Real World' label, followed by live appearances at WOMAD festivals. Listeners, and often artists themselves are transported to a state of wajad, a trance-like state where they feel 'one with God', generally considered to be the height of spiritual ecstasy in Sufism. Qawwali was essentially created by Amir Khusrau in the late 13th century in the Mughul Empire. During the first major migration in the 11th century, the musical tradition of Sama migrated to South Asia from Turkey. Rumi and his Mevlana order of Sufism have been the propagators of Sama in Central Asia. Amir Khusrau of the Chisti order of Sufis is credited with fusing the Turkish, Persian, Arabic, and South Asian musical traditions, to create Qawwali as well as the classical music tradition. The word "Sama" is used (or is the preferred name) in Central Asia and Turkey, for forms very similar to Qawwali while in Pakistan, the formal name used for a session of Qawwali is "Mehfil-e-Sama". Instruments used in qawwali include:
Algoza
Tabla
Dholak
Harmonium
Rubab (instrument)
Sitar
Sarangi
Guitar
Violin
Saxophone
Drums
Flute (Bansari)
Shehnai
Piano
Harmonica
Tanpura
Ektara
Gharha 
Keyboard
Chimta
Dhol
Dafli or Daf

A group of qawwali musicians, called Humnawa in Urdu, typically consists of eight or nine men. Women are usually excluded from traditional Muslim music as ' respectable women' are traditionally prohibited from singing in mixed-gender public gatherings. Traditionally over the centuries, this has been the practice per the general interpretation of Islamic Law by the religious scholars. Although women are encouraged to hold their own 'Women Only' gatherings for reciting religious 'Naats' and holding live dance and music parties with musical instruments on 'Just- Before- Weddings-Mehndi' celebrations. This again, has to be a 'Women Only' event per the long practiced tradition where Islam generally discourages mixed-gender gatherings among unmarried women and unmarried men. Although in the 20th century, the so-called modern era, actual practice among Islamic societies, has been that one will see a lot of female musicians and female singers holding public concerts for both men and women. For evidence, one can just read the musician name lists on this page to spot a lot of female names on those lists now.

Religious music

Hamd

There is a large number of hamd and naat singers in Pakistan. This is a type of Islamic religious music where poetical verses of the love for God (Allah) is expressed. Some of the most famous artists include Ustad Nusrat Fateh Ali Khan, along with his nephew Rahat Fateh Ali Khan. There are Sabri Brothers Qawwal, Qawwal Bahauddin Khan
from Karachi. 'Hamd' is also used extensively in Christian religious music from Pakistan and all over the world where people from this region are found. 'Hamd' is not the exclusive domain of any religion. As pointed out – it denotes praise to God, it is more extensively used in the Muslim world. It is usually used in conjunction with the Sanna (praise) and referred to as 'Hamd – o – Sanna'.
'Naat' denotes praise to the prophet Muhammad.

Naat

Nasheeds

Regional music

Pakistani folk music deals with subjects surrounding daily life in less grandiose terms than the love and emotion usually contained in its traditional and classical counterpart. In Pakistan, each province has its own variation of popular folk music. Pakistan has created many famous singers in this discipline such as the late Alam Lohar, who was very influential in the period from 1940 until 1979: he created the concept of jugni and this has been a folk song ever since, and he sang heer, sufiana kalaams, mirza, sassi and many more famous folk stories. Other famous folk singers include Sain Zahoor and Alam Lohar from Punjab and Abida Parveen, Allan Fakir and Mai Bhaghi from Sindh, Akhtar Chanal Zahri from Baluchistan and Zarsanga from Khyber Pakhtunkhwa province, who is considered the queen of Pashto folk music.

Balochi music

The music of Balochistan province is very rich and full of varieties due to the many different types of languages which are spoken in the province, including Balochi, Pashto, Brahui, Dari and Saraiki.

Balti music
According to Balti folklore, Mughal princess Gul Khatoon (known in Baltistan as Mindoq Gialmo—Flower Queen) brought musicians and artisans with her into the region and they propagated Mughal music and art under her patronage. Musical instruments such as the surnai, karnai, dhol and chang were introduced into Baltistan. Classical and other dances are classified as sword dances, broqchhos and Yakkha and ghazal dances. Chhogho Prasul commemorates a victory by the Maqpon rajas. As a mark of respect, the musician who plays the drum (dang) plays for a long time. A Maqpon princess would occasionally dance to this tune. Gasho-Pa, also known as Ghbus-La-Khorba, is a sword dance associated with the Gasho Dynasty of Purik (Kargil). Sneopa, the marriage-procession dance by pachones (twelve wazirs who accompany the bride), is performed at the marriage of a raja.

Punjabi music

Music from the Punjab province includes many different varieties. One can read the 'main article' link directly above for details.

Potohari music
Potohari has a rich tradition of poetry recital accompanied by sitar, ghara, tabla, harmonium and dholak. These poems (potohari sher) are often highly lyrical and somewhat humorous and secular in nature, though religious sher are also recited.

Sindhi music

Music from Sindh province is sung in Sindhi, and is generally performed in either the "Baits" or "Waee" styles.
 Allan Faqir
 Abida Parveen
 Bhagat Kanwar Ram
 Sanam Marvi
 Shazia Khushk
 Zarina Baloch
 Shaman Ali Mirali

Shina music
The predominant language found in Pakistan's Northern Areas has an extensive oral history which dates back several thousand years. With the increase in tourism to Pakistan's Northern Areas and increased domestic as well as international awareness of the local folk music, the Shina folk traditions have managed to stay alive and vibrant. Folk music in this region has remained relatively pure and unscathed by modern influences due to the relative isolation of this area. The arrival of many refugees from the adjacent Nuristan province of Afghanistan and the subsequent increase in commercial activity in Chitrali bazaars allowed this local form of music to flourish in the past few decades.

Saraiki music

Saraiki language is spoken by 13.9 million people in southern Punjab and northern Sindh. Atta Ullah Essa Khelvi Khan is one of the most famous Saraiki singers in Pakistan, hailing from Mianwali.

Pashto music

Pashto music is commonly found in the Federally Administered Tribal Areas, Khyber Pakhtunkhwa and in Pakistan's major urban centres such as Karachi, Islamabad, Rawalpindi, Lahore, Sialkot and Multan. Music genres include Tappa, Charbeta, Neemkai, Loba, Shaan and Badala.

Hindko music
Music from Hazara Division is sung in Hindko dialect, and is generally performed in either the Mahiyay or Shaer styles.

Modern music
Pakistani music in the 21st century revitalized itself and has many segments as follows:

Pop music 

Pop music really started in the South Asian region with the famous playback singer Ahmed Rushdi's song ‘Ko Ko Korina’ in 1966. Composed by Sohail Rana, the song was a blend of 1960s bubblegum pop, rock and roll twist music and Pakistani film music. This genre would later be termed as filmi pop. Veterans like Runa Laila and Alamgir started the pop industry in Pakistan. 
Paired with Bengali singers Runa Laila and Alamgir, the singer is considered the pioneering father of pop music, mostly hip-hop and disco, in Pakistan.

Following Rushdi's success, Christian bands specialising in jazz started performing at various night clubs and hotel lobbies in Karachi, Hyderabad and Lahore. They would usually sing either famous American jazz hits or cover Rushdi's songs. Rushdi sang playback hits along with Laila until the Bangladesh Liberation War when East Pakistan was declared an independent state. Laila, being a Bengali, decided to leave for the newly independent Bangladesh.

Nazia Hassan, the sister of another pop singer Zohaib Hassan and the member of the pop group Nazia and Zoheb, in 1981, became the first playback singer to release a pop music album. Her first album was "Disco Deewane" and second was "Aap Jaisa Koi". Both the albums broke sales records in Pakistan and India and even topped the charts in the West Indies, Latin America and Russia. Hassan won several awards for her songs, including the Filmfare Award for Best Female Playback Singer for the later and received the Pakistan's highest civilian award, Pride of Performance for her contributions in the music field.

Modern pop singers such as Atif Aslam, Ali Zafar, Hadiqa Kiani, Goher Mumtaz and Farhan Saeed have made international waves as well, winning numerous awards and performing in some of the world's most prestigious arenas. In 2013 Atif Aslam became the first Pakistani pop singer to perform at The O2 Arena London twice and has sung several songs for Hollywood and Bollywood. Aslam is also the youngest recipient of Tamgha-e-Imtiaz, one of Pakistan's highest civilian honours, for his work in the music industry. He was also named in 2012 among top performers of Dubai alongside Pitbull, Enrique Iglesias, Il Divo, Gotye, Evanescence and Swedish House Mafia.

Rock music 

The rise of rock music in Pakistan began in the 1980s when cassettes first came into Pakistan bringing in a wave of Western rock music, particularly groups such as Pink Floyd, Led Zeppelin, Van Halen, and AC/DC. Western-influenced rock music began to feature in underground concerts all across the country. In the 1980s, rock bands Vital Signs and Strings rose in defiance of the authoritarian regime and gained immense popularity amongst the youth. Vital Signs is widely regarded as Pakistan's first and most successful pop rock band. Their single "Dil Dil Pakistan" was voted the third most popular song of all time in a BBC World poll in 2003. Despite being active since the late 80s, Strings achieved widespread popularity after the release of their second album in 1992. The band went on to sell over 25 million albums worldwide. Junoon, Aaroh, and Noori followed suit in the 1990s.

Junoon pioneered the genre of Sufi rock, combining the poetry of famous Sufi poets such as Rumi, Hafez, and Bulleh Shah with the hard rock brand of Led Zeppelin and Santana and South Asian percussion such as the tabla. Junoon is one of Pakistan's and South Asia's most successful bands with over 30 million albums sold worldwide; the New York Times called Junoon "the U2 of Pakistan" and Q magazine dubbed them as "One of the biggest bands in the world". Junoon became the first rock band to perform at the United Nations General Assembly Hall and only the second Pakistani act to perform at a Nobel Peace Prize Concert.

The early 2000s saw the arrival of progressive metal, progressive rock, and psychedelic rock with bands such as Entity Paradigm and Mizraab. Mekaal Hasan Band, Call, Karavan, Jal, Roxen, Mizmaar, and Qayaas also exploded onto the music scene with different brands of rock including alternative and soft rock. The television series Pepsi Battle of the Bands was instrumental in launching Entity Paradigm, Aaroh, and the Mekaal Hasan Band, all of whom competed in the inaugural edition of the show in 2002.

The resumption of the Pepsi Battle of the Bands in 2017 after almost 15 years, heralded the resurgence of Pakistani rock with the rise of Kashmir, Bayaan, and Badnaam.

Although the heavy metal genre began to rise in popularity after the 1997 general elections, Pakistani heavy metal music can be traced back to the new wave of British heavy metal of the 1980s and 1990s with bands such as Black Warrant (band), Final Cut, and Barbarians. In recent years, numerous heavy and black metal bands including Overload, Saturn, Saakin, Karakoram, Burq - The Band, Taarma, The Nuke, and Aag have amassed followings in this niche rock music in Pakistan.

Hip hop music 

Pakistani hip hop is a blend of traditional Pakistani musical elements with modern hip hop music.

Filmi music 

Pakistan's film industry known as "Lollywood" is based in Lahore and Karachi.

Notable artists

Singers
Haroon Bacha - Pashtun singer, musician, and composer
Zeek Afridi - pop singer
Arooj Aftab - singer and composer
Salman Ahmed - pop music performer
Naheed Akhtar - film playback singer
Gulzar Alam - folk and ghazal singer
Alamgir -  singer and songwriter
Ghulam Ali - composer and performer
Sajjad Ali - composer, singer, songwriter and performer
Waqar Ali - film and TV composer
Khawaja Khurshid Anwar - film music composer, musicologist
Humaira Arshad - singer
Shani Arshad - TV & Film Composer
M Ashraf - film music composer
Atif Aslam - pop singer and performer
Rasheed Attre - film music composer
Fareed Ayaz - qawwali music performers
Ali Azmat - rock singer, formed Junoon band with Salman Ahmad

Badnaam (band) - Sufi-rung rock band
Qawwal Bahauddin - qawwal singer
Aima Baig - singer and performer
Qurat-ul-Ain Balouch - pop singer, performer
Iqbal Bano - composer, semi-classical music performer
Javed Bashir - qawwali and folk music performer
Bayaan - Alternative Rock Band
Gulnar Begum - Pashto singer 
Munni Begum - ghazal composer and performer
Roshan Ara Begum - classical and semi-classical composer, ghazal singer and performer
Amjad Bobby - film music composer
Sabri Brothers - qawwali music composers and performers

Humaira Channa - female singer

Attaullah Khan Esakhelvi - classical folk singer

Sara Haider - singer 
Mehdi Hassan - playback singer, composer and performer
Nazia Hassan - singer and composer 
Zoheb Hassan - singer and composer
Farhad Humayun - singer and composer 
Rohail Hyatt - pop musician, performer

Junaid Jamshed -  singer and songwriter
Noor Jehan - playback singer

Faisal Kapadia - rock/pop singer, and performer with Bilal Maqsood
Amanat Ali Khan - classical vocalist and ghazal singer
Asad Amanat Ali Khan - classical vocalist and ghazal singer 
Hamid Ali Khan - classical vocalist and ghazal singer 
Shafqat Amanat Ali Khan - pop, classical, and playback singer
Badar Ali Khan - (Badar Miandad) - qawwali singer and performer
Barkat Ali Khan - composer and performer of semi-classical ghazals
Natasha Khan - singer 
Nusrat Fateh Ali Khan - qawwali and ghazal composer and performer
Rahat Fateh Ali Khan - qawwali composer, performer, popular playback singer
Farida Khanum - classical vocalist and ghazal singer
Tassawar Khanum - film and non-film playback singer
Bakhtiar Khattak - pop and classical singer
Hadiqa Kiani - composer, singer and writer 

Runa Laila - film playback singer
Alam Lohar - Punjabi folk singer
Arif Lohar - Punjabi folk singer

Sanam Marvi - Sindhi Sufi singer
Aziz Mian - qawwali music composer and performer
Sher Miandad - qawwali music performer
Habib Wali Mohammad - performer and ghazal singer
Khyal Muhammad - ghazal, classical, and semi-classical singer
Goher Mumtaz - Formed the band 'Jal' with Atif Aslam
Momina Mustehsan - singer-songwriter, musician, and social activist

Nayyara Noor - film and non-film playback singer

Overload - pop band

Gul Panra (Pashto pop singer) 
Abida Parveen -Queen of Sufi music
Fariha Pervez - singer, songwriter and music producer
Malika Pukhraj - folk songs composer and performer

Abdullah Qureshi (singer) - singer, songwriter and composer

Munshi Raziuddin - qawwali composer and performer
Ahmed Rushdi - film playback singer

 Amjad Sabri - qawwal singer
Farhan Saeed - actor, and performer and a playback singer
Tina Sani - TV performer
Ali Sethi - singer, composer and writer
Mohammad Aizaz Sohail - classical singer 
Tahira Syed - film and TV playback singer

Sardar Ali Takkar - Pashto singer

Zoe Viccaji - singer and songwriter

Usman Warsi - singer and composer

Ali Zafar - pop singer and performer
Mustafa Zahid - Pop singer, formed band Roxen
Ustad Badar uz Zaman - classical and semi-classical music composer and ghazal performer
Zarsanga - Pashto singer
Vahaj Hanif - singer

Composers
Master Abdullah (1932–1994)
Khalil Ahmed (1936–1997)
Ghulam Ali
Waqar Ali - TV music composer
Khwaja Khurshid Anwar (1912–1984)
Shani Arshad
M. Ashraf (1938–2007)
Rasheed Attre (1919–1967)

Sahir Ali Bagga 
Nisar Bazmi (1925–2007)
Amjad Bobby (1942–2005)

Ghulam Ahmed Chishti (Baba Chishti) (1905–1994)

Robin Ghosh (1939–2016)

Ghulam Haider (1908–1953)
Shuja Haider 
Mehdi Hassan
Zoheb Hassan - TV performer 
Haroon
Rohail Hyatt 

Nusrat Fateh Ali Khan (1948–1997)
Zulfiqar Jabbar Khan

Shoaib Mansoor 
Bilal Maqsood 
Faakhir Mehmood 
Goher Mumtaz- 'Jal' (2002–present)

Nashad (1923–1981)
Wajid Nashad (1953–2008) - film and TV music composer

Sohail Rana - film and TV composer

Bilal Saeed 

Ustad Tafu - film music composer

Aamir Zaki (1968–2017)

Producers 

 Badar uz Zaman – Originally a Classical singer yet worked a lot in the fusion of old music with new one.
 Mekaal Hasan – a member of the Meekal Hasan Band who has produced songs like "Aadat" for Jal The Band, "Sampooran" and "Andohlan" for his own band.
 Rohail Hyatt – a member of Vital Signs who produced all the Vital Signs albums and albums for various artists like Awaz, Rahat Fateh Ali Khan, Ali Azmat. Also known as a prominent member,producer and musician of Coke Studio.
 Zeeshan Parwez produces artists.
 Kashan Admani produces music and runs a music facility Dream Station Productions. He is also the producer of Pakistan's first music web series Acoustic Station. 
 Emad ur Rahman – a member of Kaya Band who produced and recorded well known artists /solo and in bands in his 'High End Studios' like "Najam Sheraz", "Junoon", Ali Azmat", "Zoheb Hassan", Hadiqa Kiyani, Shafqat Amanat Ali and many more.

Music journalism 

Music journalism in Pakistan has grown over the years and most newspapers and TV channels have their own reporters and critics on music of Pakistan. Besides the newspapers, many news websites have also started giving coverage to Music in Pakistan. MangoBaaz, Musicians of Pakistan, and VeryFilmi are common examples.

See also
 Acoustic Station
 Coke Studio
 Culture of Pakistan
 Filmi pop
 History of Pakistani pop music
 Karachi: The Musical
 List of Pakistani musicians
 List of Pakistani film singers
 List of Pakistani folk singers
 List of Pakistani ghazal singers
 List of Pakistani qawwali singers
 List of Pakistani music bands
 List of songs about Pakistan
 National Academy of Performing Arts
 Nescafé Basement
 Pakistani hip hop
 Uth Records
 List of most-viewed Pakistani music videos on YouTube

References

External links 

 BBC Radio 3 Audio (45 minutes): The Nizamuddin shrine in Delhi 
 BBC Radio 3 Audio (45 minutes): A mahfil Sufi gathering in Karachi 
 BBC Radio 3 Audio (60 minutes): Music from the Sufi Shrines of Pakistan

Urdu music
 
Pakistani culture